Gąsawy Rządowe  is a village in the administrative district of Gmina Jastrząb, within Szydłowiec County, Masovian Voivodeship, in east-central Poland.

The village has a population of 1,500.

References

Villages in Szydłowiec County